This is a list of Malaysian first-class cricketers. First-class cricket matches are those between international teams or the highest standard of domestic teams in which teams have two innings each. Generally, matches are eleven players a side but there have been exceptions. Today all matches must be scheduled to have at least three days' duration; historically, matches were played to a finish with no pre-defined timespan. This list is not limited to those who have played first-class cricket for Malaysia and may include Malaysian players who played their first-class cricket elsewhere. The list is in alphabetical order.

See also

Malaysia national cricket team
List of Malaysian List A cricketers
For a list of first-class cricketers to have played for the Federated Malay States, see Federated Malay States cricket team

References

First class